The 2016–17 UAB Blazers women's basketball team represented the University of Alabama at Birmingham during the 2016–17 NCAA Division I women's basketball season. The Blazers, led by fourth year head coach Randy Norton, played their home games at the Bartow Arena and are members of Conference USA. They finished the season 15–15, 8–10 in C-USA play to finish in a three-way tie for eighth place. As the No. 10 seed in the Conference USA Tournament, they were defeated in the first round by North Texas.

Roster

Schedule

|-
!colspan=9 style="background:#006600; color:#CFB53B;"| Exhibition

|-
!colspan=9 style="background:#006600; color:#CFB53B;"| Non-conference regular season

|-
!colspan=9 style="background:#006600; color:#CFB53B;"| Conference USA regular season

|-
!colspan=9 style="background:#006600; color:#CFB53B;"| Conference USA Women's Tournament

See also
2016–17 UAB Blazers men's basketball team

References

UAB Blazers women's basketball seasons
UAB